Margaret of the Mother of God, born Margriet van Noort, 1587 – 1646) was a Dutch Discalced Carmelite lay sister in the Brussels Carmel.

Life
Margriet van Noort was born in Farmsum, in the far north of the Low Countries, in 1587. Her parents were Sebastian van Noort, an officer in the Army of Flanders, and Gertruda Bernaerts. On 8 December 1607 she was admitted to the Brussels Carmel by the foundress of the convent, the Venerable Ana de Jesús, becoming a lay sister in 1609 and taking the name Margaret of the Mother of God. She died there in 1646, aged 59.

Margaret is reputed to have been a prophet and wonderworker. She recorded her spiritual experiences and reflections in an autobiography. An English translation was published in 2015 under the title Spiritual Writings of Sister Margaret of the Mother of God (1635-1643).

References

1587 births
1646 deaths
17th-century Christian mystics
Discalced Carmelite nuns
Dutch Golden Age writers
17th-century Dutch women writers
17th-century writers
Carmelite mystics